Nguyễn Phước Vĩnh Lộc (October 23, 1923 – January 8, 2009) was a Lieutenant General of the Army of the Republic of Vietnam (ARVN) during the Vietnam War. He was born in Huế on October 23, 1923 when the city was a part of the French protectorate of Annam, French Indochina. He was also a cousin of the emperor Bảo Đại, the last Emperor of the Nguyễn dynasty.

During the Vietnam War, Vinh Loc served as the commander of II Corps of ARVN, which oversaw the central highlands region or Tây Nguyên from 23 June 1965 until 28 February 1968, replacing Major General Nguyễn Hữu Có. Vinh Loc was eventually replaced by Lieutenant General Lữ Mộng Lan, as a result of his failure in the Tet Offensive. The demise of Vinh Loc was a victory for both President Nguyễn Văn Thiệu and COMUSMACV General William Westmoreland. He had ruled the Central Highlands as a personal fief since 1965 and was the last of the old, independent general-warlords who had habitually defied the central government in Saigon. To Americans, he was a "mercurial, unstable opportunist" - more of a politician than a general and more effective as a governor than a fighter.

He died in Houston, Texas on January 8, 2009.

References

1923 births
2009 deaths
Army of the Republic of Vietnam generals
Nguyen dynasty
Vietnamese people of the Vietnam War
People from Thừa Thiên-Huế province